Nicolasia is a genus of African flowering plants in the tribe Inuleae within the family Asteraceae.

 Species

References

Inuleae
Asteraceae genera
Flora of Africa